() is a Czech political organisation, which has organized protests and demonstrations against the government of Czech Prime Minister Andrej Babiš and against the 2022 Russian invasion of Ukraine. Its initial goal was a challenge to get one million signatures in support of Babiš's resignation, in protest at his staying in office while the subject of a police investigation, and his previous activities as an operative of the State Security services (STB) under the former communist regime.

Background 
After the victory of ANO 2011 in elections to the Chamber of Deputies in October 2017, Czech President Miloš Zeman appointed the leader of the movement, Andrej Babiš, as Prime Minister and tasked him with the formation of the government. In December 2017, a minority government was formed of members of ANO 2011 only, but this government failed to win a January 2018 confidence vote in parliament and resigned. In June 2018, Babiš formed a second minority government, a coalition of ANO 2011 and the Social Democrats (CSSD), with the support of deputies from the Communist Party (KSČM) for the first time since the Velvet Revolution.

Shortly after the election, on 17 November 2017, the 28th anniversary of the Velvet Revolution, a group of students led Mikuláš Minář, a student of the Faculty of Philosophy and Evangelical Theology at Charles University, published a petition, "A Moment for Andrej", demanding that Babiš fulfil his pre-election promise to "support and develop democracy in the Czech Republic", explain his role in the Stork's Nest case, and respect democratic standards. Within 100 days, the petition was signed by tens of thousands of citizens, but Babiš refused to meet the group and did not respond publicly to the letter. 

The authors of the letter accused Babiš of disrespecting constitutional customs by appointing his allies as officials in state administration and on supervisory boards without parliamentary approval. In addition, the European Anti-Fraud Office (OLAF) published a report at the turn of 2017 and 2018, asserting that enough evidence existed to proceed with criminal charges against Babiš. In February 2018, the Bratislava Regional Court dismissed a lawsuit from Babiš claiming that he was being falsely accused as an StB agent.

A moment to resign 

The Million Moments for Democracy campaign was launched on 25 February 2018 on the 70th anniversary of the 1948 communist coup, and 100 days after the previous unsuccessful petition. The organizers of the campaign declared their respect for the result of the democratic elections, acknowledging that the Prime Minister should come from the victorious ANO movement, but arguing that it was unacceptable for them to be someone under criminal investigation with a past as an StB agent.

To begin with, the campaign was centered around the "Chvilka" call for resignation, in which the authors demanded Babiš's resignation as Prime Minister. The declared goal of the campaign was to obtain one million signatures for this demand in 100 days. Although this was not achieved, more than 254,000 people signed the petition by 5 June 2018, including prominent artists (including Jan Svěrák, Jiří Suchý, and Vojtěch Dyk), scientists (Jiří Grygar, Pavel Jungwirth), clergy (Václav Malý), athletes (Vavřinec Hradilek) and politicians. The organizers continued collecting signatures after this deadline, and Million Moments for Democracy developed into a longer-term campaign.

Tens of thousands more people signed the petition in November 2018, following news reports of Babiš's son Andrei Jr's stay in Crimea. By 20 November, 310,000 people had signed the petition, and by May 2019 this was over 340,000. One week after a large demonstration in Letná in June 2019, over 420,000 people had signed, including as signatories further notable artists (Milan Knížák, Alice Nellis, Aneta Langerová), scientists, clergy, athletes (Zuzana Hejnová, Michal Šlesingr, David Navara) and politicians.

Since 2018, A Million Moments for Democracy has organized 16 demonstrations. The 14th, "Je to na nás!" (It's up to us!), in Letná Park in Prague on 23 June 2019, was the biggest protest since the fall of Communism in 1989. More than 250,000 people attended the protest, calling for the resignation of Babiš and his justice secretary Marie Benešová. The 16th demonstration, "Letná 2 – znovu za demokracii" (Letná 2 – Again for Democracy) was again held in Letná on 16 November 2019, on the eve of the 30th anniversary of the Velvet Revolution in 1989. The protest was again attended by around 250,000 people. According to the organisation's chair, Mikuláš Minář: "First and foremost, we want politicians who respect democratic principles and institutions, who do not lie, do not embezzle, do not intimidate, and do not have conflicts of interest."

Demonstrations 

When Andrej Babis failed to form a second government in the spring of 2018, President Zeman was scheduled to announce on 10 April whether he would nominate someone else to form a government. The previous day, on 9 April, the Million Moments for Democracy initiative staged a rally on Wenceslas Square in Prague entitled "For a Decent Prime Minister and a Decent Government", attended by several thousand people, with similar events held in two dozen Czech cities. The protests were driven by the recent resignation of Communist MP Zdeněk Ondráček as Chair of the Commission for the Control of the General Inspectorate of Security Forces (GIBS), following demonstrations in 11 Czech cities on 5 March 2018.

Further protests in May and June 2018 were directed against the nature of the planned Babiš government, which relied on the votes of KSČM deputies. These included the so-called "silent protest" on 22 May, the "lid protest" on 29 May, and a meeting of the signatories of the Chvilka petition for resignation on 5 June, when protesters filled the upper half of Wenceslas Square. However, Babiš' Second Cabinet was sworn in on 27 June 2018.

From 29 April to 11 June 2019, demonstrations took place every week, sometimes centrally in Prague and sometimes in other parts of the Czech Republic. This series of demonstrations began in response to the appointment of Maria Benešová as Minister of Justice, replacing Jan Kněžínek, who had resigned. The organizers argued that Benešová was an inappropriate nominee for the post, as she had previously questioned Babiš's criminal prosecution in the Stork's Nest case. The series of protests culminated on 23 June 2019 with the ""Je to na nás!" event.

On 27 February 2022, the Milion chvílek initiative organized a demonstration on Wenceslas Square in support of Ukraine during the 2022 Russian invasion. It was attended by approximately 80,000 people, and guest speakers included Prime Minister Petr Fiala and Ukrainian ambassador .

Timeline of Demonstrations 

 For a decent prime minister and a decent government "(April 9, 2018, Wenceslas Square) 
 "Silent Debate" (May 22, 2018, Old Town Square with a march to the seat of the Office of the Government of the Czech Republic) 
 "The Last Ring" (May 29, 2018, Old Town Square)
 "Once and for all" (June 5, 2018, Wenceslas Square and other 200 towns and villages) 
 "Dear! March for Decent Czechia" (November 17, 2018, Old Town Square) 
 "Distrust! March for a Trustworthy Government." (November 23, 2018, Hradčanské náměstí) 
 "Judiciary! We are not blind! Don't sit at home! March for the Independence of Justice." (April 29, 2019, Old Town Square) 
 "Judiciary! Let's go again! Let's stand up for the independence of the judiciary!" (May 6, 2019, Old Town Square)
 "Judiciary! We really want resignation! We demand the resignation of Marie Benešová!" (May 13, 2019, Old Town Square and 130 other towns and villages) 
 "Everyone to Václavák - Demis! It is time to issue an account to the government." (May 21, 2019, Wenceslas Square, according to the organizers up to 50,000 people) 
 "We have had enough! We want resignation!" (May 28, 2019, 240 towns and villages) 
 "We have had enough! We want resignation!" (June 4, 2019, Wenceslas Square, according to the organizers up to 120 thousand people)
 "We want resignation! + We invite to Letná." (June 11, 2019, 300 towns and villages)
 "It's up to us!" (June 23, 2019, Letna Park, over 280,000 people) 
 "Steps for Democracy" (28 September 2019, 160 events in various places)
 "Letná 2 - again for democracy!" (November 16, 2019, Letná Plain, over 250,000 people) 
 "Demis Andrej Babiš!" (December 10, 2019, Wenceslas Square, 35-80 thousand people) 
 "Dear! The end of the rule of one magpie "(December 16, 2019, protests in 220 municipalities and cities in the Czech Republic except regional ones) 
 "The future without Babiš!" (December 17, 2019, Wenceslas Square, 15,000 people) 
 "Let's face the disintegration of institutions!" (March 1, 2020, Hradčanské náměstí -> Old Town Square) 
 "You haven't had enough yet ?!" (June 9, 2020, Staroměstské nám.) 
 "A Year of Change: Getting Started!" (November 16, 2020, online protest on the Milion Chvilek YouTube channel, over 50,000 views)
 "Light for Bečva" (December 20, 2020, Střelecký ostrov in Prague) 
 "Carnival ride through Prague - a show of government problems" (February 13, 2021, self-demonstration in front of the Strahov Stadium and a convoy around Prague, around 300 cars) 
 "Castle beyond the edge, the republic in danger!" (April 29, 2021, Wenceslas Square, 20,000 people and 72 towns and villages)

See Also 
 2017 Czech government crisis
 Czech TV crisis

References

External links 

 

Andrej Babiš
Petitions
2018 in politics
2019 in politics
Protests in the Czech Republic
Protests in the European Union
Politics of the Czech Republic